Puthenthope  (Puthen - New, Thope - Orchard) is a coastal village in Thiruvananthapuram (Trivandrum) district in Kerala, India, and situated  northwest of city centre, 16 km from Trivandrum International Airport. The village is mostly covered with coconut palms and cashew trees. Its western side edges the Arabian sea, while the east is separated by Parvathi Puthanar, a manmade canal completed during the time of Regent Sethu Lakshmi Bhai of Travancore Kingdom. There are two man made hills — one on the south (Thekkekkunnu)and the other on the north (Vadakkekkunnu), which are believed to have been made during the time of Portuguese.India's first DNA-Barcoding Centre, set up at bio-informatic centre for Tropical Garden and Research institute at Puthenthope.
Famous Malayalam Cine Artist Alencier Ley Lopez hails from Puthenthope.

History

There is little written historical record of Puthenthope's development but a strong oral tradition.

In the 16th century, the Dutch were looking for a strategic point to place their cannons, aiming at the Dutch ship movements in the Arabian Sea. They found a suitable place with tall coconut palms on the coastal area and dense forest throughout the inland. If they could build hills in between and place the cannons there, the ships could not see it but the people in the land could easily monitor. So to build the hills, the Dutch brought a group of people from Ambalappuzha, a place in the present Alappuzha district. They made the hills for the cannons to be placed. The Kusavans who came from Amplapuzha stayed back and continued with their occupation of pot making. The occupation of pot making was not suitable for many reasons–the unavailability of clay, the long walk through the forest to the nearest market, presence of notorious thieves on the forest way etc. They turned to another profitable occupation–fishing.

A journey through the coastal lines of Thiruvananthapuram reveals that there are no historical landmark sites as old as the Puthenthope mounds. The Portuguese influence can also be seen in the language spoken here. However, the Ambalapuzha link remained a mystery till the excavation of sand mounds in the late 1970s. During excavations, huge quantities of earthenware, believed to be used by the then people were discovered.

St. Francis Xavier came to India in the early 16th century and walked through the western coast of India preaching Christianity and converting people to Christianity. There is a strong assumption that he placed a cross near Njaramukham (the archaic name of Puthenthope) and prayed (present Pallimukku area). There is another belief that St. Francis heard about the death of his teacher St. Ignatius Loyola while he was near Njanramukham and so he placed the cross in his name.

There is a common belief that, some women from the family of the famous Ettuveettil Pillai, the Kazhakuttam Pillai, was given to the Mukkuvas of the area, after he being executed by Marthanda Varma. There are conflicting references but the most reliable historical reference points that these ladies from the eight families (ettu veedu) were gathered together and given to the mukkuvas on the northern border of Travancore kingdom, far away from the capital – a coastal area in the present Kayamkulam Taluk.

Fishing, once, might have been a profitable venture. The two pandakashalas, built close to the seashore, one near the Church and the other at Njaramugham, for processing and storing fish, have disappeared, but their remains account for the then flourishing fish trade.

During the heyday, people had established trade relations with Ceylon. The British East India Company had started its industrial expansions in Malaya and turning Singapore into a flourishing free port by the dawn of the 19th century and there was a big flow of human resources from China and India to these areas. Many people from Puthenthope had traveled to British Malaya before and after the Second World War. It might have been from there that some Puthenthopians moved on to England, after the independence of these countries in 1957. British must have allowed some of their civil servants to accompany them on their withdrawal (a possible reason).

Occupation

Puthenthope being a coastal village, the traditional occupation is fishing.
Coconut farming is a means of additional income.
A large population work in the Middle East sheikhdoms.

Religion

Latin Catholic
Christian Catholic community. Parish of Puthenthope belongs to the Latin Archdiocese of Trivandrum. The center of all the religious, social and political activities is the Church, St. Ignatius Church.

St Ignatius Church Puthenthope is the center of all religious and social activities. The present church was built in 1989. The foundation stone was blessed by Pope John Paul II during his visit to India in 1986. The church is the replica of St.Joseph's Cathedral, Palayam. A grotto of Mary is also built in front of the church and the statue of Mary in the grotto was brought from Lourdes by Gertrude Fernandez, a native of Puthenthope.
A parochial house, which shows the typical architecture of Kerala is also situated nearby the church. St. Ignatius Parish community hall is another building situated along with the church in the junction of Puthenthope.

 St. Vincent de Paul society
 Kerala Catholic Youth Movement(K C Y M)
 Jesus Youth
 Legion of Mary

Islam
The Puthenthope Muslim Jamath is situated east side of Puthenthope and near to Puthenthope community health centre.

Institutions

Library

Jaihind Vayanasala was Founded in 1946, at the time of the non-violent independence movement in India. The name says it all. Jai- Victory, Hind - India. Proudly remains as the cultural center of Puthenthope.

Schools
 Stella Mary's Convent and Nursery School(Bethany Sisters)
 Government Lower Primary School, Puthenthope
 St.Ignatius Upper Primary School, Puthenthope (Roman Catholic Management)

Hospitals
 Government Primary Health Center, Puthenthope
 Palliative Care Center, Stella Maris Convent, Puthenthope

Banks
 Indian Bank, Puthenthope
 Puthenthope Agricultural Improvement Co-Op Society (PAICS)

Offices
 Matsya Bhavan, Puthenthope (Fisheries Office)
 Saraswathy Thangavelu Tropical Botanical Garden and Research Institute, Puthenthope
 India Post, Puthenthope
 Seaboy Fisheries Private Limited, Puthenthope

Resorts
 Wild Palms on Sea
 The Linta's Golden Beach Ayurvedic Resort
 Palmleaves Beach Resort
 Beach House

Accessibility

Puthenthope is 3 km towards west from National Highway 66(Kaniyapuram) by road and 2.5 km from
Kaniyapuram railway station. It is 16 km away from Trivandrum International Airport.

Events and Celebrations
 Christmas
 Christmas Aquatic sports in the Beach
 Easter
 Parish Feast (Feast of St. Ignatious) - July August
 Parish Feast (Feast of Mama Mary offering Baby Jesus in the Church) - February
 Procession along the boundaries of Parish during February Parish feast
 Jaihind Cup

Attractions

 The towering St.Ignatius Church which looks like a replica of St.Joseph's Cathedral, Trivandrum.
 Manmade hills -Thekkekkunnu and Vadakkekuunu
 Vast and beautiful beach of Puthenthope
 Wild Palms on Sea homestay at beachfront
 Palmleaves Beach Resort
 Sea Side Orchid Farm - a 10-acre orchid farm
 The Linta's Golden Beach Ayurvedic Resort

Interesting facts

 Puthenthope is a matrilineal community (ancestral property is inherited to daughters, however nowadays gradual changes can be seen that ancestral property are inherited to both sons and daughters)
 India's First DNA Barcoding Centre is at Puthenthope.

Notable people

Dr. Leo Rajan Pereira, a Canadian and the United States dual citizen born at Leyo Bhavan, Puthenthope earned his doctorate from the United States. His research in quantitative analysis on New York Stock Market data from Q4 2007 to Q3 2018 had evidence that the weak-form efficient-market hypothesis of Eugene Fama, the 2013 Nobel Prize Winner did not hold true in today's economic conditions in New York Stock Exchange. The software program of IBM was employed for analyzing the vast number of data of corporations listed on NYSE and NASDAQ. After the approval of academia and industry leaders, Pereira's dissertation titled “Implications of Non-tangible Assets and Macroeconomic Parameters on Long-Term Stock Performance”] was copyrighted at U.S. Copyright and published at ProQuest. From Puthenthope Trivandrum, Dr. Pereira is the first person who earned a doctoral degree (Ph.D.) from the United States.

Joe Fernandez, the elder son of Antony Fernandez and Nicolasia Fernandez of Puthenthope is the present Chief Administrative Officer (CAO) of Lake Cowichan Town in British Columbia. He migrated to Canada in the late 60's from Singapore in pursuit of graduate degree in public administration. His father was also an eminent corporate executive in Singapore and educated at St. Xavier's College at Palayamkotta in 1910s.

Shiela Fernandez, the elder daughter of Antony Fernandez and Nicolasia Fernandez of Puthenthope was the first Certified General Accountants (CGA) originally from Puthenthope lives in Toronto Canada. She was also migrated to Canada in 1972, graduated from Manitoba University and then became the CGA.

Dr. Mahalingan Thangavelu, pathologist and former Principal of Trivandrum Medical College donated his land and building in Puthenthope in memory of his late wife, Saraswathy Thangavelu for the formation of "Saraswathy Thangavelu Tropical Botanical Garden and Research Institute, Puthenthope".

References

External links

 Puthenthope.org
 Puthenthope.in 
 Puthenthope.net 
 Puthenthope info 
 Puthenthope blog

Villages in Thiruvananthapuram district